Christian Eugene Grube (born 22 January 1985) is a British sailor who competed at the 2016 Summer Olympics in Rio de Janeiro, Brazil.

Personal life
Grube was born on 22 January 1985 in Chester, United Kingdom. He is nicknamed "Twiggy".

Sailing career
Grube competed alongside two-time Olympic silver medallist Nick Rogers in the men's 470 dinghy class in an attempt to qualify for the 2012 Summer Olympics in London but the pair were beaten out for selection to the one quota place in the British team by Luke Patience and Stuart Bithell who went on to win the silver medal.

In 2013 he teamed up with Bithell to compete in the 49er skiff class and attempt to qualify for the 2016 Summer Olympics. Towards the end of the year Bithell and Grube both switched back to the 470 class; Grube teamed up with two-time Olympian Stevie Morrison and finished fifth in their first race together at the World Cup event in Melbourne, Australia. At their next World Cup event in Miami in January 2014 they finished third.

At the 2014 ISAF Sailing World Championships held in Santander, Spain Grube competed in the 49er class alongside Morrison. The pair finished 11th and were then dropped from the Royal Yachting Association (RYA) elite Olympic Podium squad.

In March 2016 Grube paired up with Luke Patience in the 470 class. Patience had already qualified for the 2016 Olympics alongside Elliot Willis but was forced to find a new partner and requalify after Willis was diagnosed with bowel cancer and had to withdraw to undergo treatment. They took part in a World Cup event at Hyeres in France, despite suffering a black flag disqualification in one race they finished tenth overall. In May 2016 Patience and Grube were confirmed as the Great Britain team's entry for the men's 470 in Rio.

Grube and Patience have again qualified to represent Great Britain at the 2020 Summer Olympics in the 470 class.

References

External links
 
 
 
 
 

Living people
1985 births
British male sailors (sport)
Sportspeople from Chester
Sailors at the 2016 Summer Olympics – 470
Olympic sailors of Great Britain
Extreme Sailing Series sailors
Sailors at the 2020 Summer Olympics – 470